52nd Police Precinct Station House and Stable is a historic police station located in Norwood in the Bronx, New York City.  It was built 1904–1906 and is a three-story, red brick structure approximately 50 feet by 80 feet in size.  It is in the style of a Tuscan villa.  It features a 21-foot square clock tower with large polychrome terracotta clock faces on three sides. 

It was designated a New York City Landmark in 1974 and was listed on the National Register of Historic Places in 1982. The architects were Stoughton & Stoughton of Mount Vernon, New York.

Gallery

References

Government buildings on the National Register of Historic Places in New York City
Government buildings completed in 1904
Infrastructure completed in 1904
History of the Bronx
New York City Designated Landmarks in the Bronx
Government buildings in the Bronx
Police stations on the National Register of Historic Places
National Register of Historic Places in the Bronx
Norwood, Bronx
New York City Police Department buildings